The Military Anthem of the People's Liberation Army, also known as the March of the Chinese People's Liberation Army, is a patriotic song of the People's Republic of China.  The song was written by Zhang Yongnian and composed by Zheng Lücheng.

The song's former name was March of the Eighth Route Army, and was one of the six songs in the Chorus of Eighth Route Army, all of which had Gong Mu as song writer and Zheng Lücheng as the composer.  The song became known as the "March of the Liberation Army" during the second Chinese Civil War.  The lyrics were re-edited by the General Political Department in 1951 and the song renamed to March of the Chinese PLA in 1965.

On July 25, 1988, the Central Military Commission decided to use the song as the official anthem of the People's Liberation Army.

Variant
A variant form of the song called Parade March of the PLA is used as the main theme of the marching of formative military parade, such as that in Chinese National Day Parade. From 1949 onwards, this has been the march past tune of the PLA in every military parade.

Change

The lyrics of this song has been changed in different times in different eras.

1. The banner of freedom is flying high (later changed: the whole Chinese people are completely liberated → the flag of victory is flying high → the flag of Mao Zedong is flying high)

2. Strive for democracy and freedom, (later changed to: the final victory)

3. Strive for national liberation. (later changed to: Liberation of the whole country!)

See also
 60th anniversary of the People's Republic of China
 March of the Volunteers
 Military song of China

External links
Version performed in the 1964 Song and dance epic "The East is Red"
Orchestral rendition of the march
Orchestral MP3 Audio from PLA Daily
Orchestral and Choral MP3 Audio from PLA Daily

Mandarin-language songs
Chinese patriotic songs
Chinese military marches
Asian anthems